Sir Walter Ian Percival QC (11 May 1921 – 4 April 1998) was a British Conservative Party politician.

Background
Percival was educated at Latymer Upper School and St Catharine's College, Cambridge. He was commissioned from Sandhurst into The Buffs in 1941 and served in the Second World War in North Africa and Burma, attaining the rank of Major. He became a barrister, was called to the Bar from the Inner Temple in 1948, and also worked as a part-time economics professor. He served as a councillor on Kensington Borough Council 1952–59. He was made a Queen's Counsel in 1963, and was knighted in 1979.

He married Madeline Cooke in 1942, having met her in Burma, and had a son and a daughter. The family home was in Tenterden, Kent. On retirement, he supported several causes, including the establishment of a hospital in India after the Bhopal disaster. In 1993 he became the head of a Trust to complete the hospital, following lengthy legal negotiations with Union Carbide while he was engaged as an attorney in the US law firm Sidley and Austin. He died before its completion.

Political career
He first stood unsuccessfully in the Battersea North constituency at the 1951 general election and again at the 1955 election.  He was elected as Member of Parliament for Southport at the 1959 general election, holding the seat until he retired at the 1987 election.  Although coveting a Ministerial post, he was overlooked for the position he wanted in 1979 when Margaret Thatcher came to power, Secretary of State for Northern Ireland. Instead, he served as Solicitor General from 1979 to 1983.

On some issues, Percival's political views were to the right of some in the Conservative Party; he campaigned unsuccessfully to restore the death penalty (introducing an unsuccessful Bill to restore it for terrorists in 1984), and held strong views on the rigorous application of the law. He also called for the criminalisation of clubs and newsletters that existed for the purpose of allowing homosexuals to meet one another. Percival was a freemason.

References
The Times Guide to the House of Commons, Times Newspapers Ltd, 1951, 1966 & 1983

1921 births
1998 deaths
People educated at Latymer Upper School
Alumni of St Catharine's College, Cambridge
Conservative Party (UK) MPs for English constituencies
Graduates of the Royal Military College, Sandhurst
Buffs (Royal East Kent Regiment) officers
Councillors in the Royal Borough of Kensington and Chelsea
Members of Kensington Metropolitan Borough Council
English barristers
UK MPs 1959–1964
UK MPs 1964–1966
UK MPs 1966–1970
UK MPs 1970–1974
UK MPs 1974
UK MPs 1974–1979
UK MPs 1979–1983
UK MPs 1983–1987
Members of the Privy Council of the United Kingdom
Solicitors General for England and Wales
20th-century British lawyers
Freemasons of the United Grand Lodge of England
British Army personnel of World War II
English King's Counsel
Knights Bachelor
20th-century English lawyers
British people in British Burma